In topology, a branch of mathematics, the quasi-relative interior of a subset of a vector space is a refinement of the concept of the interior.

where  denotes the closure of the conic hull.

Let  is a normed vector space, if  is a convex finite-dimensional set then  such that  is the relative interior.

See also

References

  

Topology